Humphrey Ocean  (born 22 June 1951) is a contemporary British painter.

Early life 
Humphrey Ocean was born Humphrey Anthony Erdeswick Butler-Bowdon, on 22 June 1951 in Sussex. He went to Ampleforth College and in 1967 went to Tunbridge Wells School of Art for two years, going on to do a Foundation Course at Brighton College of Art and DipAD Painting at Canterbury College of Art.

It was at Canterbury that he was taught by Ian Dury, then a painter. From 1971 he was bass player with the band Kilburn and the High Roads formed at Canterbury with Dury. They opened for The Who on its Christmas tour in 1973, after which Ocean resigned from music with the notable exception of recording the single "Whoops-a-Daisy" written by Ian Dury and Russell Hardy, for Stiff Records in 1978.

Art 
Ocean's earliest notable work as an artist was as a designer and pencil-artist for record album covers and sleeves; in particular, he contributed pencil drawings for the cover and lyric insert for 10cc's 1975 album The Original Soundtrack, and inner-sleeve art for Paul McCartney and Wings' 1976 album Wings at the Speed of Sound.

In 1983, Ocean painted Paul McCartney's portrait as part of the first prize in the 1982 Imperial Tobacco Portrait Award with his painting Lord Volvo and his Estate and the following year painted the poet Philip Larkin's portrait, also for the National Portrait Gallery, a work described by the novelist Nick Hornby as "unanswerable". 

In 1988 Ocean travelled to Northern Brazil with the American anthropologist Stephen Nugent, a lecturer at the University of London, eager to expose colonial caricatures of the region. Their subsequent book, Big Mouth: The Amazon Speaks, was published by Fourth Estate (HarperCollins) in 1990, and features evocative illustrations of Brazil. In 1999 the National Maritime Museum commissioned Ocean to paint a picture of modern maritime Britain. Throughout the 1990s and the early years of the twenty-first century, Ocean's paintings were exhibited in many of the leading museums in the United Kingdom.

In 2002, Ocean was Artist-in-Residence at the Dulwich Picture Gallery, culminating in how's my driving, an exhibition linking 17th-century Dutch genre paintings with south London suburbia. That year he was awarded an honorary fellowship by Canterbury College of Art where he had been a student between 1970-1973. In 2009 he worked on an Artangel project Life Class: Today's Nude directed by Alan Kane, shown on Channel 4 television. He also painted Catherine Hughes in her role as principal of Somerville College, Oxford.

A handbook of modern life 
Ocean came to prominence with his exhibition A handbook of modern life (2012–13) at the National Portrait Gallery London curated by Rosie Broadley who wrote:

"Working swiftly in gouache on large sheets of paper in his studio, Ocean paints his sitters, including family members, friends and professional acquaintances, in simple forms and bold colours.  The project has an obsessive character that is compelling and, when seen together, the portraits are an exuberant display of the artist's love of painting, colour and people. The sitters have shared the experience of sitting for a portrait, but Ocean has illuminated something unique about each person-how they tilt their head or how they wear their shirt - with an immediacy that tethers the image to the day they visited the studio."

Etching 

In addition to his portrait of Philip Larkin, he is perhaps best known for his iconic etching, Black Love Chair, which appeared on the cover of Paul McCartney's 2007 album Memory Almost Full. This is an image McCartney chose from the series of  etchings begun in 2003 when Ocean was working with Maurice Payne in Miankoma Studio in Amagansett, Long Island.

Dot Books 
In 2017 Ocean exhibited Dot Book 1 in Drawing Together at the Courtauld Gallery London curated by Dr Ketty Gottardo and Dr Ben Thomas who wrote:

"Humphrey Ocean’s Dot Book also represents a type of artistic wayfaring, on a local scale, as it could be described as recording a notional trip to the supermarket where it becomes ‘impossible to get to Sainsbury’s’ because there are so many arresting motifs to discover along the way which prompt the thought ‘I like that and I want to tell somebody I saw that’. However, this is not a case of taking a line for a walk but of a series of vivid illuminations registered, as it were, at thirty miles an hour through the windscreen of a family estate car. The unremarkable objects, logos and snatched views of corners of suburbia collected together in this album of precise, crisply executed drawings are all 'perfectly ordinary' (to use the title of one of Ocean's exhibitions)."

Recent 

Ocean was elected a Royal Academician in 2004. He was Royal Academy Professor of Perspective 2012 - 2020, a position once held by J. M. W. Turner.

In 2013 Lord Volvo and his Estate (1982) by Ocean was voted one of 57 of the nation’s favourite paintings and appeared on billboards around Britain in Art Everywhere organised by the Art Fund. In 2014 he completed a portrait of Randy Lerner for the National Portrait Gallery. In the same year he advised on Turner's approach to perspective in Mike Leigh’s film Mr Turner.

In 2015 he was made an Honorary Doctor by the University of Kent and in 2016 he was appointed a trustee of the Royal Drawing School. Ocean designed a road sign for his friend Margaret Calvert for the 50th Anniversary of the British Road Sign exhibition at the Design Museum (2015) and showed in books + papers (2015), "Wären Fluss und Meere Tinte..." (2017) and books + papers 2 (2019) at Christine Koenig Galerie, Vienna.

For the BBC, on Radio 4 he featured in Will Gompertz Gets Creative (2015), presented The Essay on Radio 3 on Impington Village College (2016) and Only Artists with Mark Alexander on Radio 4 (2018). In 2018 Ocean's solo exhibition I've No Idea Either of works on paper and sculpture was at Sims Reed Gallery London. In 2019 he had a solo exhibition Birds, Cars and Chairs in the Keeper's House at the Royal Academy of Arts. A 320 page full colour monograph of his work was published by the Royal Academy of Arts in autumn 2019. Simultaneously published by the RA is A Book of Birds by Humphrey Ocean. In 2020 he showed his painting Self in Me, Myself, I at Christine Koenig Galerie, Vienna. Fresh as Paint, Ocean's personal selection of objects and art from the school collections will be shown at Eton College in 2022.

Humphrey Ocean is married to artist Miranda Argyle and has two daughters, Ruby and Beatrice. He lives and works in south London.

Solo exhibitions
 1984: Paul McCartney New Portrait by Humphrey Ocean And Pictures Made on the 1976 Wings Tour, National Portrait Gallery
 1992: Double-Portrait, Tate Liverpool
 1997: urbasuburba (with Jock McFadyen), the Whitworth Art Gallery, Manchester
 1999: The Painter's Eye (with John Tchalenko), National Portrait Gallery, London
 2003: how's my driving, Dulwich Picture Gallery
 2006: How do you look (film with John Tchalenko), Hunterian Museum, Royal College of Surgeons of England
 2009: Perfectly Ordinary, Sidney Cooper Gallery, Canterbury Christ Church University
 2011:  Here and There, Jesus College Cambridge
 2012:  A handbook of modern life, National Portrait Gallery, London
 2018: I've No Idea Either, Sims Reed Gallery, London
 2019: Birds, Cars and Chairs, Keeper's House, Royal Academy of Arts, London
2022: Fresh as Paint, Verey Gallery, Eton College

Public collections
 British Council, London
 Bruges-Zeebrugge Port Authority, Belgium
 Christ Church, Oxford
 Ferens Art Gallery, Hull
Fitzwilliam Museum Cambridge
 Hertford College, Oxford
 Imperial War Museum, London
 National Maritime Museum, London
 National Portrait Gallery, London
Pallant House Gallery, Chichester
 Queen Mary College, London
Royal Academy of Arts, London
 Royal Library, Windsor Castle
 Royal Opera House, Covent Garden
 Royal Society of Chemistry
 Somerville College, Oxford
 St Cross College, Oxford
 St John's College, Cambridge
 Scottish National Portrait Gallery, Edinburgh
 South London Gallery
 University of Birmingham
 Victoria & Albert Museum, London
 Whitworth Art Gallery, Manchester
 Wolverhampton Art Gallery

References

External links
 
 

1951 births
Living people
People from Pulborough
English rock bass guitarists
Male bass guitarists
20th-century English painters
English male painters
21st-century English painters
Alumni of the University for the Creative Arts
Royal Academicians
20th-century English male artists
21st-century English male artists
People educated at Ampleforth College